Yoo Ki-hyun (born November 22, 1993), better known mononymously as Kihyun, is a South Korean singer and songwriter. He is a vocalist in the South Korean boy group Monsta X from Mnet's survival show No.Mercy, which debuted under Starship Entertainment in 2015. Kihyun made his solo debut with the single album Voyager in March 2022, in addition to having released several original soundtracks, further establishing himself as "K-pop God", "Vocal God", and "The K in K-pop".

Early life 
Kihyun was born on November 22, 1993 in Seoul, South Korea. He came from a family of four, which includes his father, mother, older brother, and himself. He graduated from Dong-ah Institute of Media and Arts.

Career

2014–2015: Debut and career beginnings 
In December 2014, Kihyun competed in the Mnet's survival show No.Mercy. Along with six other trainees from the show, Monsta X was formed, a hip-hop idol group that debuted under Starship Entertainment on May 14, 2015 with the EP Trespass. Through the survival show, he also released 2 collaboration tracks in 2015; "Pillow" with Sistar's Soyou and Giriboy on January 14, and "0 (Young)" with Giriboy, Mad Clown, Jooyoung, and other remaining trainees in No.Mercy on February 4.

In May 2015, Kihyun and fellow Monsta X member Jooheon, recorded a television soundtrack titled "Attractive Woman" for KBS2's Orange Marmalade. In October, he also sang his first solo original soundtrack "One More Step" for the MBC's television drama She Was Pretty.

2016–2020: Original soundtracks and solo activities 
Kihyun appeared as a contestant on King of Mask Singer with the name "Tell Them I'm the Dragon King" on January 3, 2016. He won the first round against Apink's Namjoo, known as "Good Daughter Shim Cheong". On the second round of the competition, he lost to Lim Jeong-hee, known as "Rolled Good Fortune", with the difference of three votes.

Kihyun sung the acoustic version of "The Tiger Moth" for the soundtrack for MBC's drama Shopping King Louie, which was released on October 27.<ref name="SD">{{cite web|last=Choi|first=Ju-ri|script-title=ko:몬스타 엑스, MBC ‘쇼핑왕 루이’OST 7 ‘부나비 두 가지 버전 공개|trans-title=Monsta X, MBC Shopping King Louis''' OST 7 the two versions revealed|url=https://www.sedaily.com/NewsView/1L2UU5KDGJ/|access-date=November 7, 2018|website=Seoul Economic Daily|date=October 27, 2016|language=ko|archive-date=November 25, 2018|archive-url=https://web.archive.org/web/20181125115712/https://www.sedaily.com/NewsView/1L2UU5KDGJ/|url-status=live}}</ref>

In June 2017, an original soundtrack titled "I've Got A Feeling" for SBS' drama Suspicious Partner was released.

In May 2018, Kihyun recorded "Can't Breathe" for MBC's Partners for Justice with fellow Monsta X member Jooheon, and in June, he also recorded "Love Virus" for tvN's drama What's Wrong with Secretary Kim together with WJSN's Seola.

For Monsta X's album All About Luv, Kihyun participated in writing and producing of three songs, including "Who Do U Love?" featuring French Montana (and its remix by will.i.am), "Middle of the Night", and "Beside U". He had previously co-written "I Do Love U" from Take.1 Are You There? with three other members, as well as co-written and produced the song "No Exit" for their debut EP Trespass.

In April 2020, Kihyun released a song for the soundtrack of KBS2's Welcome, titled "Again Spring", and then a song for KBS2's Do Do Sol Sol La La Sol, titled "To Be With You", on October 7. In October, Kihyun had a solo stage for M Studio on M Countdown, where he performed a cover of the song "Bad" by Christopher.

 2021–present: Solo debut with Voyager and other solo activities 
In February, Kihyun released a song for the soundtrack of the drama Replay: The Moment, titled "O.M.O.M.". He was praised for his work on the drama, particularly his voice was able to express the "sweetness and softness" that complemented the drama.

In August, Kihyun appeared as a special guest on Naver Now's Night Studio, where he sang covers of several songs, including "Middle of the Night" by Monsta X and "Radioactive" by Imagine Dragons, with a live band. He also became a new DJ for Naver Now's Midnight Idol, alongside group member I.M.

In September, Kihyun appeared again as a contestant on King of Mask Singer's special duet episode for the 2021 Chuseok holiday. Kihyun also paired up with a co-label solo artist Jeong Se-woon as the "Cheongdam-dong Sworn Brothers". They lost in the first round against MeloMance's Kim Min-seok and actor Kim Woo-seok as the "Brave Brothers".

He made his solo debut with the single album Voyager, along with the lead single of the same name, contributing to the lyrics of the song ", (Comma)" on March 15, 2022. Kihyun tested positive for COVID-19 on March 30.

On August 4, Kihyun released a song for the soundtrack of the webcomic After School Lessons for Unripe Apples, titled "Is This Love". 

On September 16, he appeared and performed in the music festival KPOP LAND 2022, to commemorate love, peace, and a better world, in Jakarta, Indonesia.

On October 14, Kihyun performed in the KCON event KCON 2022 Japan, held at Ariake Arena in Tokyo. On October 24, he also released his first EP Youth, along with the lead single of the same name. On October 25, Kihyun was selected as the sole host for Naver Now's new live show PLAY!, starting on November 7.

On November 12, he released a song for the soundtrack of the new SBS' Friday-Saturday drama The First Responders, titled "Fire".

In January 2023, Kihyun had a pictorial and an interview for the fashion magazine Arena Homme + Korea.

 Public image and impact 
For over seven years since debut, Kihyun continuously expands his musical spectrum, and has grown into a vocalist who can do his part, in any genre of song and any stage, in any environment. As the main vocalist of Monsta X, he has always captivated the K-pop fans by showing off his unwavering live skills despite the group's unique strong performances. In addition to team activities, he not only participated in various drama OSTs, but also released cover videos of various genres, acting as a "Vocal of Confidence", further establishing himself as "K-pop God", "Vocal God", and "The K in K-pop".

In October 2019, an official statement from Kakao M revealed that Monsta X, which Kihyun is assigned, received 7,906 shares (about ,000,000,000) of it to resolve issue rights to strengthen solidarity with affiliates and entertainers. The group is one of many Kakao M-affiliated artists who received stocks from the company, of which, according to reports, is also preparing to rejoin Korea Exchange through a re-IPO.

In July 2022, Kihyun was voted as "Emotional Vocal Tone King Idol", with a vote rate of 30.62% out of a total of 297,873 votes after fierce competition among many candidates, such as Mamamoo's Wheein, Kim Jae-hwan, and BTS' Jimin.

In September, Architect Professor Yoo Hyun-jun expressed his gratitude to Kihyun, with the released of photos that contain the contents of captured texts and comments that he left on Daum Cafe, watching Sherlock Hyun-jun videos on YouTube during a delayed flight. Because of this, "Sherlock Hyun-jun" became a real-time trend on Twitter and the number of YouTube subscribers also increased, exceeding 470,000.

Kihyun had inspired the group Blitzers for the reason that his "expression on stage felt so cool".

 Other ventures 
 Arts and photography 
In 2016, Kihyun alongside Minhyuk held a special exhibition "Moment in November" at the Space Art 1 in Jung-gu, Seoul from November 26 to 27. Under the theme of "moment", this exhibition consists of Kihyun's photos and Minhyuk's calligraphy and drawings. A space was also prepared for them to see the before and after Monsta X's debut photos, undisclosed polaroids, childhood photos, their cherished items, as well as events for fans, due to the warm response from domestic and foreign fans, and to repay the support they showed during the group's activities. 

In 2018, Kihyun held a special exhibition "Moment of November 2018 with Kihyun" at The Space Gallery in Gangnam, Seoul for three days from July 6 to 8. This exhibition is held for the first time in two years, which consisted of photos and works taken by him under the theme of "moment", with about 3,000 domestic and foreign visitors coming to the exhibition. It was unfolded with various photos, cherished items, and events including the appearances of the members and their childhood, plus a special space to share precious memories with his fans to commemorate the third anniversary of Monsta X's debut.

 Endorsements 
In May 2022, Kihyun became the new muse for the Korean unisex street brand AQOstudiospace's 2022 summer collection, which held various promotions, such as SNS participation and exclusive photocards events. In June, he became the model of the Korean cosmetic and skincare brand the SAEM through the Korean star and style magazine AtStyles June cover issue. On August 22, Kihyun became the model for the Korean lifestyle beauty brand Lalafranc through the Korean fashion, beauty, and life magazine Singles''.

Philanthropy 
In November 2016, proceeds from the 2-days special exhibition "Moment in November" were donated in the names of Kihyun, Minhyuk, and fan club, Monbebe.

In January 2021, he donated ,000,000 to the Good Neighbors, a charity that helps low-income families in South Korea, including support kits containing hygiene products for the girls.

In December 2022, Kihyun donated his cherished items to the Korean general news agency News 1's "Bazaar of Love" and all its proceeds will be donated to Severance Hospital for the treatment and care of children from low-income families and with severe, rare, and incurable diseases.

Discography

Extended plays

Single albums

Singles

As lead artist

As featured artist

Collaborative singles

Other charted songs

Soundtrack appearances

Music videos

Filmography

Television shows

Web shows

Radio shows

Songwriting 
All credits are adapted from the Korea Music Copyright Association, unless stated otherwise.

Awards and nominations

Notes

References

External links 
 
 

1993 births
21st-century South Korean male  singers
Dong-ah Institute of Media and Arts alumni
Living people
Japanese-language singers of South Korea
English-language singers from South Korea
People from Goyang
People from Seoul
Singers from Seoul
Starship Entertainment artists
Monsta X members
Weekly Idol members
South_Korean male idols